Anaptomecus is a genus of huntsman spiders that was first described by Eugène Louis Simon in 1903.

Species
 it contains six species, found in Panama, Costa Rica, Ecuador, and Colombia:
Anaptomecus levyi Jäger, Rheims & Labarque, 2009 – Colombia
Anaptomecus longiventris Simon, 1903 (type) – Costa Rica, Panama, Ecuador
Anaptomecus paru Guala, Labarque & Rheims, 2012 – Colombia, Ecuador
Anaptomecus suni Guala, Labarque & Rheims, 2012 – Ecuador
Anaptomecus temii Jäger, Rheims & Labarque, 2009 – Panama
Anaptomecus yarigui Galvis & Rheims, 2018 – Colombia

See also
 List of Sparassidae species

References

Further reading

Araneomorphae genera
Sparassidae
Spiders of Central America
Spiders of South America